Penn State  Scranton (formerly known as Penn State Worthington Scranton) is a Commonwealth Campus of Pennsylvania State University located in Dunmore, Pennsylvania. The Scranton campus was named in memory of Worthington Scranton, a prominent industrialist and civic leader of Northeastern Pennsylvania.

History
In 1923, Pennsylvania State College (not yet a university) established a branch school in Scranton, offering evening technical institute programs. The school was renamed the Scranton Center in 1951 and became part of the General Extension division of the Penn State.  In 1953, its courses were restructured as associate degree programs. The school left its first home at the Longfellow School Annex in Scranton in June 1968 and moved to the present site which was purchased with money raised through contributions from private citizens and local industries. The new campus opened in September 1968 as a member of Penn State's Commonwealth Campus System. The first campus baccalaureate degree program was offered in 1995 and on July 1, 1997, Scranton joined 11 other Penn State locations as a campus of the University's Commonwealth College. The name change to Penn State Scranton became effective on May 1, 2018.

Athletics 
Penn State Scranton teams participate as a member of the United States Collegiate Athletic Association (USCAA). The Nittany Lions are a member of the Pennsylvania State University Athletic Conference (PSUAC). Men's sports include baseball, basketball, cross country and soccer; while women's sports include basketball, cross country, softball and volleyball.

References

External links 
Official website

Educational institutions established in 1923
Pennsylvania State University colleges
Universities and colleges in Lackawanna County, Pennsylvania
USCAA member institutions
1923 establishments in Pennsylvania
Scranton